An annular solar eclipse will occur on Tuesday, February 17, 2026. A solar eclipse occurs when the Moon passes between Earth and the Sun, thereby totally or partly obscuring the image of the Sun for a viewer on Earth. An annular solar eclipse occurs when the Moon's apparent diameter is smaller than the Sun's, blocking most of the Sun's light and causing the Sun to look like an annulus (ring). An annular eclipse appears as a partial eclipse over a region of the Earth thousands of kilometres wide.

Images 
Animated path

Related eclipses

Eclipses in 2026
 An annular solar eclipse on February 17.
 A total lunar eclipse on March 3.
 A total solar eclipse on August 12.
 A partial lunar eclipse on August 28.

Solar eclipses 2026–2029

Saros 121

Metonic series 
 All eclipses in this table occur at the Moon's ascending node.

References

External links 
 http://eclipse.gsfc.nasa.gov/SEplot/SEplot2001/SE2026Feb17A.GIF

2026 2 17
2026 in science
2026 2 17
2026 2 17